Dubinino is a rural locality (a selo) in Kabansky District, Republic of Buryatia, Russia. The population was 337 as of 2010. There are 2 streets.

Geography 
Dubinino is located 57 km north of Kabansk (the district's administrative centre) by road. Inkino is the nearest rural locality.

References 

Rural localities in Kabansky District
Populated places on Lake Baikal